Greenawald is an unincorporated community in Albany Township in Berks County, Pennsylvania, United States. Greenawald is located along Pennsylvania Route 143 and Maiden Creek in the southern part of the township.

References

Unincorporated communities in Berks County, Pennsylvania
Unincorporated communities in Pennsylvania